The Comoros black parrot (Coracopsis sibilans) is a medium-sized parrot endemic to the Comoros.  Historically, it has been treated as a subspecies of the lesser vasa parrot, although it shows morphological, ecological and behavioural differences. It was split as a distinct species by the IOC in 2021.

References

Comoros black parrot
Comoros black parrot
Comoros black parrot
Comoros black parrot
Comoros black parrot